Magnus Strandman Lundal (born 6 April 2000) is a Norwegian football midfielder who plays for Stabæk.

Growing up in Vestre Aker IF, he joined Stabæk's youth system at the age of 15 while also representing Norway as a youth international. He made his debut for Stabæk in a 2019 Norwegian Football Cup thrashing of Elverum, and made his league debut in June 2020 against Sandefjord. After signing with the first team in May 2020, he was not loaned out because none of the lower leagues had started again after the COVID-19 pandemic.

Career statistics

References

2000 births
Living people
Footballers from Oslo
Norwegian footballers
Stabæk Fotball players
Eliteserien players
Association football midfielders
Norway youth international footballers